Johnsondale is an unincorporated community in Tulare County, California, United States. A post office opened in Johnsondale in 1939. The Post Office was closed on September 19, 1980. The community is named after Walter Johnson of the Mount Whitney Lumber Company.

Climate
According to the Köppen Climate Classification system, Johnsondale has a semi-arid climate, abbreviated "BSk" on climate maps.

References

Unincorporated communities in Tulare County, California
Populated places in the Sierra Nevada (United States)
Unincorporated communities in California